Valeria Yegay (born ) was an Azerbaijani group rhythmic gymnast. She represented her nation at international competitions.

She participated at the 2008 Summer Olympics in Beijing. 
She also competed at world championships, including at the 2005, 2007 and 2009 World Rhythmic Gymnastics Championships.

References

External links

https://database.fig-gymnastics.com/public/gymnasts/biography/8051/true?backUrl=%2Fpublic%2Fresults%2Fdisplay%2F544%3FidAgeCategory%3D8%26idCategory%3D78%23anchor_41799
http://www.agf.az/en/about/history/2008/20160829041337548.html

1986 births
Living people
Azerbaijani rhythmic gymnasts
Place of birth missing (living people)
Gymnasts at the 2008 Summer Olympics
Olympic gymnasts of Azerbaijan